Rocco Alexander Luccisano (April 30, 1919 – October 11, 2008) was a politician in Montreal, Quebec, Canada. He was a member of the Montreal city council from 1970 to 1986, serving as a member of mayor Jean Drapeau's Civic Party.

Councillor
Luccisano first ran for the Montreal city council in December 1968, in elections held after the municipality of Saint-Michel was annexed to Montreal. He was defeated, but ran again in the 1970 municipal election and won election for Saint-Michel's first ward. The latter election took place against the backdrop of the FLQ crisis.

Luccisano was re-elected in 1974, 1978, and 1982. He sought election for a fifth term in 1986 and lost to Montreal Citizens' Movement candidate Frank Venneri.

Death
Luccisano died of heart failure in October 2008, after a five-month struggle with lung disease.

Electoral record

References

1919 births
2008 deaths
Canadian people of Italian descent
Montreal city councillors